José Nuno Rodrigues Xavier (born 7 March 1997) is a Portuguese footballer who plays for Campeonato de Portugal league club Maria da Fonte as a forward.

Football career
On 7 February 2016, Xavier made his professional debut with Vitória Guimarães B in a 2015–16 LigaPro match against Olhanense.

On 31 August 2017, he joined English Championship club Wolverhampton Wanderers on a one-year deal.

References

External links

Stats and profile at LPFP 
National team data 

1997 births
Living people
Portuguese footballers
Portuguese expatriate footballers
Association football forwards
S.C. Braga players
Padroense F.C. players
FC Porto players
Vitória S.C. players
G.D. Chaves players
Juventude de Pedras Salgadas players
Wolverhampton Wanderers F.C. players
Merelinense F.C. players
Liga Portugal 2 players
Campeonato de Portugal (league) players
Portugal youth international footballers
Sportspeople from Braga
Portuguese expatriate sportspeople in England
Expatriate footballers in England